Charles Martin Robertson (11 September 1911 – 26 December 2004) was a British classical scholar and poet. He specialised in the art and archaeology of Ancient Greece.

Early life
He was the elder son of Donald Struan Robertson and Petica Coursolles, née Jones (1883–1941), who hosted a literary salon. Martin Robertson, as he was always known, attended the Leys School and Trinity College, Cambridge. In 1934 Robertson graduated and moved to Athens as a student of the British School, under the direction of the archaeologist Humfry Payne.

Academic career
Robertson returned to England in 1936 as assistant Keeper in the Greek and Roman department of the British Museum, cataloging the pottery from the excavations at Al Mina in Syria led by C. Leonard Woolley. At this time Robertson was implicated in the scandal of the damage during cleaning to the Elgin Marbles; the controversy cost him promotion at the museum. Robertson served in the war from 1940 to 1946, marrying Theodosia Cecil Spring Rice in 1942. After the war Robertson returned to the British Museum. He resigned in 1948 to succeed Bernard Ashmole as Yates Professor of Classical Art and Archaeology at University College London. In 1961 Robertson again succeeded Ashmole, this time as Lincoln Professor of Classical Archaeology and Art at Oxford in which role he served until his retirement in 1978.

As a scholar Robertson is best remembered for his work on Greek art, in particular vase painting, of which he was a student, and in many respects heir, of John Beazley.  When Beazley died in 1970, Robertson and another Beazley student, Dietrich von Bothmer updated and enlarged Beazley's earlier lists of painters, Paralipomena: Additions to Attic black-figure Vase-painters and to Attic Red-figure Vase-painters, published in 1971.  His A History of Greek Art, which first appeared in 1975, remains the authoritative text and still used for its breadth of learning and deep understanding of the topic; an overview of the topic written by, at that time, one of the most eminent scholars in the field. 1975, too, saw the publication of The Parthenon Frieze. His first book was Greek Painting (1959) in which he used vase-paintings and work in other media to try to recreate the lost wall-paintings that were known only through textual references. His work on Athenian red-figure vase-painting finally culminated in The Art of Vase-Painting in Classical Athens (1992), a book published while he was in his eighties. He was also the recipient of the festschrift "The Eye of Greece" edited by Donna Kurtz and Brian A. Sparkes.

Poetry
As a poet Robertson published various collections, including Crooked Connections (1970), For Rachel (1972), A Hot Bath at Bedtime (1975), and The Sleeping Beauty's Prince (1977).

Family
He was married to (Theodosia) Cecil, née Spring Rice. Thomas Dolby is their son.

Selected publications
The Art of Vase-painting in Classical Athens. Cambridge: Cambridge University Press, 1992
Greek, Etruscan and Roman Vases in the Lady Lever Art Gallery, Port Sunlight. Liverpool: National Museums and Galleries on Merseyside/Liverpool University Press, 1987.
Greek Painting. Geneva:  Skira, 1959
The Parthenon Frieze. New York: Oxford University Press, 1975
Between Archaeology and Art History.  Oxford: Clarendon Press, 1963
Corpus Vasorum Antiquorum. Great Britain. Castle Ashby, Northampton.  Oxford: Oxford University Press/British Academy, 1979
Why Study Greek Art? An Inaugural Lecture Delivered at University College, London. London: H. K. Lewis & Co., 1949.

References

Sources
 Article by Ian Jenkins (curator at the British Museum)
 Entry in the Oxford Dictionary of National Biography
 Biographical obituary
 Biographical obituary
 Biographical obituary
 Biographical obituary
 Festschrift with biographical foreword and a full bibliography

Scholars of ancient Greek pottery
1911 births
2004 deaths
Alumni of Trinity College, Cambridge
Lincoln Professors of Classical Archaeology and Art
British male poets
20th-century British poets
20th-century British male writers